This is a timeline of women in warfare in the United States from 1900 until 1949.

1900s
1901: The United States establishes the Army Nurse Corps as a permanent part of the Army. The Corps remains all-female until 1955.
1908: The United States establishes the Navy Nurse Corps on 13 May. The Corps remains all-female until 1965. The first 20 nurses (the first women in the Navy) report to Washington, D.C. in October 1908. By the end of World War I, their numbers increase to 1,386. During the war, the nurses serve on transport duty overseas in England, Ireland, and Scotland.

1910s
1913: U.S. Navy nurses (all women) serve on the transports USS Mayflower and USS Dolphin.
 World War I:
During the course of the war, 21,498 U.S. Army nurses (American military nurses were all women then) served in military hospitals in the United States and overseas. Many of these women were positioned near to battlefields, and they tended to over a million soldiers who had been wounded or were unwell. 272 U.S. Army nurses died of disease (mainly tuberculosis, influenza, and pneumonia). In 1917 U.S. Army nurses Clara Ayres and Helen Wood became the first female members of the U.S. military killed in the line of duty. They were killed on May 20, 1917, while with Base Hospital #12 aboard  en route to France. The ship's crew fired the deck guns during a practice drill, and one of the guns exploded, spewing shell fragments across the deck and killing Nurses Ayres and Wood. Eighteen African-American Army nurses served stateside caring for German prisoners of war (POWs) and African-American soldiers. They were assigned to Camp Grant, IL, and Camp Sherman, OH, and lived in segregated quarters.

Hello Girls was the colloquial name for American female switchboard operators in World War I, formally known as the Signal Corps Female Telephone Operators Unit. During World War I, these switchboard operators were sworn into the Army Signal Corps. This corps was formed in 1917 from a call by General John J. Pershing to improve the worsening state of communications on the Western front. Applicants for the Signal Corps Female Telephone Operators Unit had to be bilingual in English and French to ensure that orders would be heard by anyone. Over 7,000 women applied, but only 450 women were accepted. Many of these women were former switchboard operators or employees at telecommunications companies. Despite the fact that they wore Army Uniforms and were subject to Army Regulations (and Chief Operator Grace Banker received the Distinguished Service Medal), they were not given honorable discharges but were considered "civilians" employed by the military, because Army Regulations specified the male gender. Not until 1978, the 60th anniversary of the end of World War I, did Congress approve veteran status and honorable discharges for the remaining women who had served in the Signal Corps Female Telephone Operators Unit.

The first American women enlisted into the regular armed forces were 13,000 women admitted into active duty in the U.S. Navy during the war. They served stateside in jobs and received the same benefits and responsibilities as men, including identical pay (US$28.75 per month), and were treated as veterans after the war.

The U.S. Marine Corps enlisted 305 female Marine Reservists (F) to "free men to fight" by filling positions such as clerks and telephone operators on the home front.

In 1918 during the war, twin sisters Genevieve and Lucille Baker transferred from the Naval Coastal Defense Reserve and became the first uniformed women to serve in the U.S. Coast Guard. Before the war ended, several more women joined them, all of them serving in the Coast Guard at Coast Guard Headquarters.

These women were demobilized when hostilities ceased, and aside from the Nurse Corps the uniformed military became once again exclusively male. In 1942, women were brought into the military again, largely following the British model.

1920s
1920: A provision of the Army Reorganization Act grants U.S. military nurses the status of officers, with "relative rank" from second lieutenant to major (but not full rights and privileges). U.S. Nurses (all women) serve aboard the first U.S. ship built as a floating hospital, the USS Relief (AH-1).

1930s
1938: The (U.S.) Naval Reserve Act permits the enlistment of qualified women as nurses.

1940s

1942
1942: The Women's Reserve of the U. S. Coast Guard Reserve program (officially nicknamed the "SPARs"), was first established in 1942. 
1942: YN3 Dorothy Tuttle became the first SPAR enlistee when she enlisted in the Coast Guard Women's Reserve on the 7th of December, 1942. 
1942: The Marine Corps Women's Reserve (MCWR) was authorized by the U.S Congress in July 1942 to relieve male Marines for combat duty in World War II. 
1942: U.S. President Franklin D. Roosevelt signed the Public Law 689 creating the Navy's women reserve program on 30 July 1942. 
1942: The U.S. Women's Army Auxiliary Corps (WAAC) was founded. 
1942: The name of the U.S. Women's Army Auxiliary Corps (WAAC) is officially changed to Women's Army Corps (WAC).

1943
1943: The U.S. Women's Army Corps recruited a unit of Chinese-American women to serve with the Army Air Forces as "Air WACs."

1944
1944: Public Law 238 granted full military rank to members of the U.S. Navy Nurse Corps, who were then all women.
1944: Aleda Lutz became the first American servicewoman to be killed in combat during World War II.
1944: On December 28, 1944, Aleda Lutz became the first military woman to receive the Distinguished Flying Cross, which she received posthumously.

1945

 The first African-American woman sworn into the Navy Nurse Corps was Phyllis Mae Dailey, a Columbia University student from New York, on March 8, 1945. She was the first of only four African-American women to serve as a Navy nurse during World War II.
 The first five African-American women entered the Coast Guard Women's Reserve (SPARs). Olivia Hooker was the very first African-American woman to enter the Coast Guard.
 1945: SPAR Marjorie Bell Stewart was awarded the Silver Lifesaving Medal by CAPT Dorothy Stratton, becoming the first SPAR to receive the award.

1946
Nellie Jane DeWitt becomes Superintendent/Director of the United States Navy Nurse Corps.

1947

 25 July The SPARs was inactivated.
 Lotus Mort becomes the first female warrant officer in the U.S. Marine Corps.
 The Army-Navy Nurse Act of 1947 (Public Law 36-80C) creates the Army Nurse Corps and Women's Medical Specialist Corps into part of the Regular Army and Navy and ensures that all nurses are classed as commissioned officers.

1948

 31 January: Turkey Point Lighthouse keeper, Fannie Salter, retired from active service and was the last woman to retire as a lighthouse keeper.
 June 12, President Harry Truman signed Public Law 625, the Women's Armed Services Integration Act, which allowed women to become permanent, regular members of the U.S. armed forces in the Army, Navy, Marine Corps, and the recently formed Air Force. Prior to this act, women, with the exception of nurses, served in the military only in times of war. However, the act limited service of women by excluding them from Air Force and Navy vessels and aircraft that might engage in combat. On July 7, 1948, Kay Langdon, Wilma Marchal, Edna Young, Frances Devaney, Doris Robertson, and Ruth Flora becomes the first six enlisted women to be sworn into the regular U.S. Navy. Esther Blake was the first woman to enlist in the regular U.S. Air Force; she enlisted in the first minute of the first hour of the first day regular Air Force duty was authorized for women on July 8, 1948. On October 15, 1948, the first eight women to be commissioned in the regular U.S. Navy, Joy Bright Hancock, Winifred Quick Collins, Ann King, Frances Willoughby, Ellen Ford, Doris Cranmore, Doris Defenderfer, and Betty Rae Tennant took their oaths as naval officers.

 The position Assistant Chief of Naval Personnel for Women (ACNP(W)) was created from the original WAVES leadership position. This was the first notion of the Office of Women's Policy. The woman officer who held the position was an 0-6 for as long as she filled the billet. No flag rank was allowed per Title 10 USC 6015.
 Colonel Katherine A. Towle becomes the first Director of Women Marines.

1949

 On 6 January 1948, Edith DeVoe was transferred to the Navy Nurse Corps and assigned to the Navy Communication Annex Dispensary in Washington, D. C., which made her the first black nurse in the regular navy.
 The  Women's Reserve of the Coast Guard Reserves (SPARs) is re-established by the President on 4 August 1949, and becomes effective on 1 November 1949.
 The U.S. Air Force Nurse Corps was established.
 The first African-American women enlisted in the U.S. Marine Corps.

 The U.S. Air Force Nurse Corps was established.

See also 	
 Timeline of women in war in the United States, pre-1945
 Timeline of women in warfare in the United States from 1950 to 1999
 American women in World War I
 American women in World War II
 Timeline of women in warfare in the United States from 1950 to 1999
 Timeline of women in warfare and the military in the United States, 2000–2010
 Timeline of women in warfare and the military in the United States from 2011–present

References

warfare usa 1900-1949
Women in warfare in the United States from 1900 to 1949
Women in warfare in North America
History of women in the United States